The Bluebonnet Bowl was an annual college football bowl game played in Houston, Texas.  A civic group was appointed by the Houston Chamber of Commerce Athletics Committee in 1959 to organize the bowl game. It was held at Rice Stadium from 1959 through 1967, and again in 1985 and 1986. The game was played in the Astrodome from 1968 through 1984, as well in 1987.  When held in the Astrodome, it was called the Astro-Bluebonnet Bowl. The proceeds from the bowl games were distributed to various Harris County charitable organizations. The game was discontinued following the 1987 season due to poor ticket sales and lack of a title sponsor.

The Bluebonnet Bowl generally featured a team from Texas against an out-of-state opponent; 19 out of the 29 games involved a team from Texas.  From 1980 to 1987, with the exception of 1981, a runner-up from the Southwest Conference played against an at-large opponent.  The hometown Houston Cougars played in four games, all before joining the SWC.  Runners-up from the Big 8 or Southeastern Conferences were also perennial participants.

The bluebonnet is the state flower of Texas.

Bowl games returned to Houston in 2000 with the Houston Bowl, and then the Texas Bowl since 2006.

Game results

Record by conference

Teams with multiple appearances

See also
List of college bowl games

References

 
Defunct college football bowls
Recurring sporting events established in 1959
Recurring sporting events disestablished in 1987
1959 establishments in Texas
1987 disestablishments in Texas